The Unity Labour Party (ULP) is a democratic socialist political party in Saint Vincent and the Grenadines. Currently the governing party, it is led by Prime Minister Ralph Gonsalves.

The party is an observer of COPPPAL and an affiliate of Foro de São Paulo. From 1994 to 2014, the party was a member of Socialist International.

History
The party was formed in 1994 from the merger of the Saint Vincent Labour Party and the Movement for National Unity. The parties had run as an alliance in the elections earlier that year, promising voters that they would merge after the election regardless of the result. In the 1998 elections they received 54.6% of the vote, but the New Democratic Party won a majority of seats. The first leader of ULP, Sir Vincent Beache, resigned after the elections, and was succeeded by Ralph Gonsalves. However, in the 2001 general election the ULP won its first parliamentary majority, winning twelve of the fifteen seats. The party won another majority in the 2005 general election. With a fall in popular support, the party was narrowly re-elected in the 2010 general election, winning 8 out of 15 elected seats in the House of Assembly of Saint Vincent and the Grenadines and the same taking place in the 2015 general elections and was re-elected in the 2020 general election, this time winning 9 out of 15 seats but lost the popular vote to the New Democratic Party.

In November 2020, Ralph Gonsalves, Prime Minister of  Saint Vincent and the Grenadines since 2001, made history by securing the fifth consecutive victory of his Unity Labour Party (ULP) in  general election.

Electoral history

House of Assembly elections

References

External links
Official website

Labour parties
Former member parties of the Socialist International
Political parties in Saint Vincent and the Grenadines
Political parties established in 1994
Republicanism in Saint Vincent and the Grenadines
Republican parties
Socialist parties in North America
1994 establishments in Saint Vincent and the Grenadines